The U R Rao Satellite Centre (URSC), formerly ISRO Satellite Centre (ISAC) is an Indian Space Research Organisation centre for the design, development, and construction of Indian satellites. It was established in 1972 as Indian Scientific Satellite Project (ISSP) in Peenya Industrial Estates of Bengaluru. ISAC was renamed as U. R. Rao Satellite Centre (URSC) after the former ISRO Chairman and ISAC founding director Dr. Udupi Ramachandra Rao with effect from 2 April 2018. URSC is situated in Vimanapura Post. 

The centre launched its 100th satellite on January 12, 2018, encompassing the INSAT series, the IRS series, and GSAT communication satellites.

Organisations under URSC include the Laboratory for Electro-Optics Systems (LEOS) and the ISRO Satellite Integration and Testing Establishment (ISITE).

Organisation
Like other ISRO centres, URSC is organised using  matrix management. The centre is divided into Functional Areas such as Control and Mission Area, Electronic Systems Area, Mechanical Systems Area, and Reliability and Components Area. 

Each area is divided into groups. For instance, Control and Mission area has many groups like Control Systems Group, and Flight Dynamics Group. Groups are divided into divisions. For example, Control Systems Group has divisions such as Control Electronics Division, Control Dynamics and Analysis Division. 

Project Planning and Evaluation Group, Computer and Information Group, Space Astronomy and Instrumentation Division are independent. Facilities groups like Thermovac facility and projects such as IRS, INSAT, SATNAV operate separately.

Directors
M. Sankaran is the current director.
Prof Udupi Ramachandra Rao (1976-1984) was the founding director. He was a Padma Bhushan recipient who later became the Chairman of the Indian Space Research Organisation and held the post of Chancellor at Indian Institute of Space Science and Technology, Thiruvananthapuram until his last days.
 Col N Pant (1984-1990), a Padma Shri recipient
 Dr K Kasturirangan (1990-1994), a recipient of the three major civilian awards from the Government of India: the Padma Shri (1982), Padma Bhushan (1992) and Padma Vibhushan (2000). He later became the Chairman of the Indian Space Research Organisation
 Shri R Aravamudan (1994-1997)
 Dr P S Goel (1997-2005), a Padma Shri recipient
 Dr K. N. Shankara, (2005-2008), a Padma Shri recipient
 Dr T K Alex (2008-2012), a Padma Shri recipient
 Dr S. K. Shivkumar (2012-2015), a Padma Shri recipient
 Dr Mylswamy Annadurai (2015-2018), a Padma Shri recipient
 Dr P. Kunhikrishnan (2018-2021)

References

External links
https://www.ursc.gov.in

Research institutes in Bangalore
Space programme of India
Space technology research institutes
Research institutes established in 1972
1971 establishments in Mysore State